Alphateam – Die Lebensretter im OP (German: Alpha Team - The Lifesaver in the OR) was a German hospital drama television series that aired on Sat.1 between 1996 and 2005. The series covered the work of a team of doctors, nurses and caregivers in the fictional Hamburg Hansa Clinic, located in the Altona district.

See also
 List of German television series

External links
 

German drama television series
1996 German television series debuts
2005 German television series endings
German medical television series
Television shows set in Hamburg
German-language television shows
Sat.1 original programming